Argo Parahyangan, also commonly known as GOPAR is an executive class train operated by Indonesian Railway Company (PT Kereta Api Indonesia) between Gambir railway station, Jakarta and Bandung or Kiaracondong in Java, Indonesia. From Jakarta to Bandung the train stops at Bekasi, Cimahi, and Purwakarta, where as from Bandung to Jakarta it stops only at Jatinegara. KAI operates 34 trips daily in the route.

Etymology 
The train is named after Parahyangan or Priangan or Preanger, which is a cultural and mountainous region in West Java.

This train is a combination of names from the previous Argo Gede and Parahyangan service. Argo Gede train was an executive class train for the same route, which has been used since 1995. Parahyangan train was a business class train that has been used since 1971. During the initial period of operation since 2010, Argo Parahyangan train also became the first Argo class train to have a class other than the executive class. At present Argo Parahyangan train only has business and executive services.

Facilities
At present 17 trains of several types of Argo Parahyangan series operate. The latest Argo Parahyangan Excellence train is the fastest among different types, which takes journey at 2 hours and 50 minutes.

For the Turangga series, the train uses CC206 locomotive consisting of one generator train, six executive train carriages, and one dining car. Harina series uses CC206 locomotive consisting of one economy train carriage, two business train carriages, four executive train carriages, one generator train, and one dining car. 

Argo Parahyangan Regular train series usually consists of four economies plus train carriages, four executive carriages, one dining, and one power generator car. As for the additional trains, the series consists of one generator train, one dining car, four executive train carriages, and three economy train carriages. 

The new configured train, which was inaugurated in March 2018, has capacity of 400 seats passengers per train, consisting of eight executive carriages, one dining train with praying facility, and one generator carriage. Each coach has Two 32-inch TV, installed at the front and rear end, and two 19-inch screens hang on the ceiling of the train. The train is equipped with modern technology such CCTV and smoke detector. Seats have sleep and reading lights, audio jack for earphone or headset, fold-able mini tables on the armrests, and separate cabin baggage.

Additionally Argo Parahyangan that departs from Gambir at 08.45 WIB and 18.45 WIB, and from Bandung at 05.00 WIB and 14.15 WIB, has one Priority class coach with seating capacity of 28 passengers. This train car has extra facilities such as audio video on demand (AVOD) in every seat, a minibar, 52-inch flat screen TV, special attendants, luxurious toilet, as well as premium seats.

Train Schedule 
schedule as of February 10, 2021

See also 
 PT Kereta Api
 Rail transport in Indonesia
 List of named passenger trains of Indonesia

References

External links 
 

Passenger rail transport in Indonesia
 Rail transport in Indonesia